The Hellenic Arms Industry (Elliniki Viomichania Oplon, abbreviated EBO) has been the main arms manufacturer of Greece. Its creation is linked to a desire of Greek governments for "complete self-sufficiency" of Greece in the areas of personal and other weapons (in contrast to past experience, when local manufacturers could only partially cover the needs of the Armed Forces).

History

A proposal in 1975 by a big Greek chemical company, Chropei of Piraeus, for the adoption of its own-developed rifles and submachine guns, was rejected after testing proved that its weapons were not up to desired standards. Similarly, the Greek state did not support Pyrkal, which was already producing the FN FAL rifle under license. Subsequently, EBO was founded by the state in Aigio in 1976, after an agreement to initially produce under licence Heckler & Koch models adopted by the Greek Army, but with the intent to also design arms of its own. During its foundation ceremony, a Greek pistol of the 1820s (used in the Greek Revolution) was placed on the foundation stone to represent the continuity of Greece's arms-making craft.

Since that time, the company has grown by significantly acquiring other companies, and has produced in its several factories hundreds of thousands of rifles (military and civilian) and machine guns, as well as pistols, mortars, ammunition and explosives, rocket launchers, land mines, grenades, anti-aircraft weapons, various types of bombs, cannons, night vision equipment, aircraft metal parts, as well as specialized machinery, tools, uniforms, body armor vests and reinforced composite/plastics. Many of the above are of EBO's own development (and have included the founder and designers Athan Calligeris, Ph.D., Anastasios Georgiou Artemis 30 Anti-Aircraft System and the Aris IV Anti-Tank Rocket) Fairfox 2000 rifle. The company has also been a major and well-known exporter of weapons. However, its financial state has been shaky almost since its early steps. In 2004, it merged with Pyrkal, forming EAS, in an effort of the Greek state to better control and regulate this sector of the nation's defence industry.

Products
Kefeus rifle
Fairfox 2000 rifle
E44-E 81 mm Mortar

References

Additional references 
Jane's Infantry Weapons (e.g. 2001-2002 ed.)
L.S. Skartsis, "Greek Vehicle & Machine Manufacturers 1800 to present: A Pictorial History", Marathon (2012)  (eBook)

External links
EAS - Information about EBO 
EBO (in Greek)
EAS (in Greek)

Firearm manufacturers of Greece
Defence companies of Greece
Manufacturing companies based in Athens
Greek brands